Montes de Oca (Spanish for Mounts of Goose or Hills of Goose) may refer to: Foothills of the Golden Goose

Places
 Montes de Oca Canton, Costa Rica
 Montes de Oca (shire), Burgos province, Spain
 Montes de Oca, Santa Fe, a town in Santa Fe Province in Argentina

Other uses
 Montes de Oca (surname)

See also
 La Unión de Isidoro Montes de Oca, in Guerrero state, Mexico
 Villafranca Montes de Oca, in Burgos province, Spain
 Fernando Montes de Oca Fencing Hall, an indoor sports venue in Mexico City, Mexico
 Oca (river), a river in the north of Spain, whose source is in Montes de Oca